Rachel Nuwer is an independent American journalist and author of the 2018 nonfiction book Poached: Inside the Dark World of Wildlife Trafficking (Da Capo Press). She has covered the issue of poaching from the perspectives of criminals, activists and science for years in prominent publications, including the Smithsonian, BBC Future, The New York Times, and National Geographic.

Early life 
Nuwer grew up in Mississippi and studied biology at Loyola University New Orleans where she spent time researching Mekong River fish. She got a masters degree in ecology at the University of East Anglia, and attended New York University's Science, Health and Environmental Reporting Program. The master's thesis she completed for her East Anglia degree was published by the Cambridge University Press.

Nuwer says that her education in biology helped shape her career.

Career 

Nuwer has written for Smithsonian, BBC Future, The New York Times, and National Geographic. She is well known for working under cover to access black markets for wildlife.

Awards and honors 
Nuwer won the Abe Fellowship for Journalists in 2017.

Her book Poached won the American Society of Journalists and Authors general non-fiction book award, a Nautilus Book Award, and the Santa Monica Public Library Green Prize for Sustainable Literature.

Bibliography

References

External links 

Year of birth missing (living people)
Living people
American online journalists
American women journalists
Scientific American people
Journalists from Mississippi
21st-century American journalists
21st-century American non-fiction writers
21st-century American women writers
American women non-fiction writers
Loyola University New Orleans alumni
Alumni of the University of East Anglia
New York University alumni